Two Days Away is an album by Elkie Brooks, released in 1977.

Background
Brooks' breakthrough second album, released in 1977, propelled her into solo stardom in the UK and Europe. Including the top ten hits "Pearl's a Singer" and "Sunshine After the Rain", it had a distinct American sound largely due to the work of the legendary writers and producers Jerry Leiber and Mike Stoller. It remains one of Brooks' finest albums and is available on CD, paired with its predecessor Rich Man's Woman.

Single releases
 "Pearl's a Singer" (UK #8, 1977)
 "Saved" (1977)
 "Sunshine After the Rain" (UK #10, 1977)
 "Do Right Woman, Do Right Man" (1977)

Details
 Recorded in 1976 at Electric Lady Studios in New York, USA; Record Plant in New York, USA; Air Studios in London, England. Mastered at Masterdisk, New York, USA.
 "Two Days Away" reached number 16 and remained in the UK charts for 20 weeks.

Track listing 
 "Love Potion No. 9" (Jerry Leiber, Mike Stoller) - 3:42
 "Spiritland" (Elkie Brooks, Pete Gage) - 3:19
 "Honey, Can I Put On Your Clothes" (Jean Monte Ray) - 3:22
 "Sunshine After the Rain" (Ellie Greenwich) - 3:23
 "Pearl's a Singer" (Leiber, Stoller, Ralph Dino, John Sembello) - 3:39
 "Mojo Hannah" (Fay Hale, Clarence Paul, Barbara Paul) - 3:00
 "Do Right Woman, Do Right Man" (Lincoln Moman, Dan Penn) - 3:28
 "You Did Something For Me" (Leiber, Stoller) - 2:50
 "Nightbird" (Leiber, Stoller, Pete Gage, Steve York) - 3:06
 "Saved" (Leiber, Stoller) - 2:40

Charts

Personnel
Elkie Brooks – vocals
Isaac Guillory - guitars
Jean Roussel - keyboards
Trevor Morais - drums
Steve York - bass

Additional personnel
Mike Stoller - piano, keyboards
Pete Gage, Jerry Friedman, Eric Weissberg - guitars
George Devens, Carl Hall, Peggy Blue, Morris Pert - percussion
Corky Hale - harp
George Devens - vibraphone
New York Horns
Meco Monardo (arranger)
Bob Millikam
Danny Kahn
Barry Rogers
Dave Taylor
George Young
Lew Del Gatto
Muscle Shoals Horns
Harrison Calloway (arranger)
Charlie Rose
Harvey Thompson
Ronnie Eades
Meco Monardo (arranger), Tony Posk, Guy Lumia, Elliot Rosoff, Rick Sortonne, Carol Webb, Joe Goodman, Julien Barber, Jesse Levy - strings
Carl Hall, Peggy Blue, Marry Ellen Johnson, Barbara Ingram, Evette Benton, Carla Benson, Jimmy Chambers, George Chandler, Lee Vanderbilt - backing vocals
Steve Nye, Carmine Rubino - engineering
Bob Ludwig - mastering
Jerry Leiber & Mike Stoller - production

References

1977 albums
Elkie Brooks albums
Albums produced by Jerry Leiber
Albums produced by Mike Stoller
A&M Records albums